The Drury Plaza Hotel Orlando Lake Buena Vista is a resort hotel on the property of Walt Disney World Resort in Lake Buena Vista, Florida. The resort is located across from the Disney Springs area.

History
The Travelodge at Lake Buena Vista opened on November 21, 1972. In 1984, Trusthouse Forte assumed management and the property was renamed the Viscount Hotel. In 1989,  Travelodge resumed management and the hotel became the Travelodge Lake Buena Vista. In 2000, Best Western assumed management, and the property became the Best Western Lake Buena Vista Resort Hotel. The hotel was renovated in 2004 and has 2 outdoor pools. The hotel was purchased in August 2017 by Drury Hotels. In December 2019, Drury announced plans to remodel the property, adding a new wing, expanding the hotel from 325 to 604 rooms. The hotel closed in March 2020, due to the COVID-19 pandemic and ceased to be affiliated with Best Western. Construction of the new wing and renovations to the existing wing began in 2020. The hotel is set to debut in October 2022 as the Drury Plaza Hotel Orlando Lake Buena Vista, with the first 264 rooms opening. The remainder of the 604-room hotel will open in 2023.

References

External links
 Drury Plaza Hotel Orlando Lake Buena Vista official website
 Drury Plaza Hotel Orlando Lake Buena Vista official chain website

Hotels in Walt Disney World Resort
Hotels established in 1972
Hotel buildings completed in 1972
1972 establishments in Florida